Ali Lenin Aguilera Marciales (born 1967 in Caracas, Venezuela) is a Venezuelan lawyer, entrepreneur, and a Strategic Business Development Consultant.

Professional life
Aguiler has been working  as a lawyer and Strategic Business Consultant for more than 20 years.

Aguilera received his J.D. degree with honors from the University Santa Maria Law School in 1993. in 2002 he obtained from University of Miami his Master of Science, Major in Professional Management, then in 2004, also from University of Miami his Master of Business Administration.

In 2013 he attended Radcliffe Institute for Advanced Study at Harvard University, Cambridge International Consulting; He studied Negotiation and Persuasion. In 2015 at Florida International University. Aguilera studied Transnational Law: The U.S.Legal System, Dispute Resolution without Borders: Crossborder Litigation & International Arbitration.							

Aguilera has  managed  the Strategic  Business Development area as well as the law field. He advises for private sectors, nationally and internationally in (Latin America, Europe and United States). He is a member of the International Association of Young Lawyers (AIJA), the International Lawyers Association (ILA), and the Honorable Colegio de Abogados del Distrito Federal (Venezuela BAR).

See also 
 
List of Venezuelans

References

1967 births
People from Caracas
Living people
Venezuelan people in rail transport
Venezuelan businesspeople
21st-century Venezuelan lawyers